The 2003 SMU Mustangs football team represented Southern Methodist University (SMU) as a member the Western Athletic Conference (WAC) during the 2003 NCAA Division I-A football season. Led by second-year head coach Phil Bennett, the Mustangs compiled an overall record of 0–12 with a mark of 0–8 in conference play, placing last out of ten teams in the WAC.

Schedule

Roster

Team players in the NFL
No SMU players were selected in the 2004 NFL Draft.

The following finished their college career in 2003, were not drafted, but played in the NFL.

References

SMU
SMU Mustangs football seasons
College football winless seasons
SMU Mustangs football